In algebra, an Iwahori subgroup is a subgroup of a reductive algebraic group over a nonarchimedean local field that is analogous to  a Borel subgroup of an algebraic group. A parahoric subgroup is a  proper subgroup that is a finite union of double cosets of an Iwahori subgroup, so is analogous to a parabolic subgroup of an algebraic group. Iwahori subgroups are named after Nagayoshi Iwahori, and "parahoric" is a portmanteau of "parabolic" and "Iwahori".  studied Iwahori subgroups for Chevalley groups over p-adic fields, and  extended their work to more general groups. 

Roughly speaking, an Iwahori subgroup of an algebraic group G(K), for a local field K with integers O and residue field k, is the inverse image in G(O) of a Borel subgroup of G(k).

A reductive group over a local field has a Tits system (B,N), where B is a parahoric group, and the Weyl group of the Tits system is an affine Coxeter group.

Definition
More precisely, Iwahori and parahoric subgroups can be described using the theory of affine  Tits buildings. The (reduced) building B(G) of G admits a decomposition into facets. When G is  quasisimple the facets are  simplices and the facet decomposition gives B(G) the structure of a simplicial complex; in general, the facets are polysimplices, that is, products of simplices. The facets of maximal dimension are called the alcoves of the building.

When G is  semisimple and  simply connected, the parahoric subgroups are by definition the  stabilizers in G of a facet, and the Iwahori subgroups are by definition the stabilizers of an alcove. If G does not satisfy these hypotheses then similar definitions can be made, but with technical complications.

When G is semisimple but not necessarily simply connected, the stabilizer of a facet is  too large and one defines a parahoric as a certain finite index subgroup of the stabilizer. The stabilizer can be endowed with a canonical structure of an O-group, and the finite index subgroup, that is, the parahoric, is by definition the O-points of the  algebraic connected component of this O-group. It is important here to work with the algebraic connected component instead of the  topological connected component because a nonarchimedean local field is totally disconnected.

When G is an arbitrary reductive group, one uses the previous construction but instead takes the stabilizer in the subgroup of G consisting of elements whose image under any  character of G is integral.

Examples
The maximal parahoric subgroups of GLn(K) are the stabilizers of O-lattices in Kn. In particular, GLn(O) is a maximal parahoric. Every maximal parahoric of GLn(K) is conjugate to GLn(O). The Iwahori subgroups are conjugated to the subgroup I of matrices in GLn(O) which reduce to an upper triangular matrix in GLn(k) where k is the residue field of O; parahoric subgroups are all groups between I and GLn(O), which map one-to-one to parabolic sugroups of GLn(k) containing the upper triangular matrices. 
Similarly, the maximal parahoric subgroups of SLn(K) are the stabilizers of O-lattices in Kn, and SLn(O) is a maximal parahoric. Unlike for GLn(K), however, SLn(K) has  conjugacy classes of maximal parahorics.
When G is  commutative, it has a unique maximal compact subgroup and a unique Iwahori subgroup, which is contained in the former. These groups do not always agree. For example, let L be a  finite separable extension of K of ramification degree e. The torus L×/K× is compact. However, its Iwahori subgroup is OL×/OK×, a subgroup of index e whose cokernel is generated by a uniformizer of L.

References

Linear algebraic groups
Representation theory